Mount Olive may refer to:

Places

Canada
Mount Olive-Silverstone-Jamestown, a neighbourhood in Toronto, Ontario
Mount Olive (Canadian Rockies), a mountain on the Continental Divide/British Columbia-Alberta in the Canadian Rockies

United States

Cities and towns
Mount Olive, Alabama (disambiguation)
Mount Olive, Arkansas (disambiguation)
Mount Olive, Illinois
Mount Olive, Indiana
Mount Olive, Kentucky
Mount Olive, Mississippi
Mount Olive, Missouri
Mount Olive, Stokes County, North Carolina
Mount Olive, Wayne County, North Carolina
Mount Olive, Ohio
Mount Olive, Shenandoah County, Virginia
Mount Olive Township, New Jersey

Other places in the US
Mount Olive Cemetery, in Chicago
Mount Olive (Natchez, Mississippi), a historic house
Mount Olive Cemetery, in Middletown New Jersey

Other uses
Mount Olive College, located in Mount Olive, North Carolina
Mount Olive Pickle Company, a food processing firm

See also
Mount of Olives
Mountolive
Mount Olivet (disambiguation)